Caribbean Bay is an indoor/outdoor water park located in Yongin, South Korea, on the outskirts of Seoul. Opened in 1996.
Caribbean Bay is part of the Everland Resort, but requires a separate admission fee.

With the opening in 2008 of its newest attraction, the "Wild River Zone", Caribbean Bay expanded its capacity by 30%. The park includes a wave pool, the world's Longest Lazy river Ride, a Sandy Pool, a Wading Pool for young children, Various Water Slides, and a Salt Sauna.

Caribbean Bay has received "Must-see Waterpark Awards" from International Association of Amusement Park Attractions.

Facilities

Aquatic Center
The Aquatic Center is an Indoor Waterpark zone in Caribbean Bay. It has several pools including a Wave Pool and Diving Pool. It also has 3 watertube Slides. Its indoor location means it is open all year. It also operates a beauty zone, sauna, hot springs like jjimjilbangs in South Korea.
The main facilities are: Spa & Sauna, Indoor Wave Pool, Quick Rider (indoor tube & water slide).

Sea Wave
The Sea Wave is famous for its large outside wave pool. It generates 2.4m artificial waves. It is the highest wave pool (tied with Ocean World V )  in South Korea.
The main facilities are: Wave Pool, Diving Pool, Wave Village, Sandy rest zone.

Bay Slide
Bay slide zone is for water slides. It has 6 tube slides and 3 water bobsleighs.
The main facilities are: Tube Ride, Water Bobsleigh, Bobsleigh Village.

Fortress

Fortress is for fun water play it has world's longest streaming pool (at the construction time) called "Lazy Pool". Adventure pool splashes 2.4 ton of water at once.
The main facilities are: Flowing Water Pool, Surfing Ride, Adventure Pool.

Wild River
The Wild River (opened in 2008) is an extreme water play zone. It has 5 tube slides, 1 Boomerango. Wild Blaster is flume ride-like tube slide but more extreme and wet. Tower Raft is large tube slide track that 4 people can ride at once. Tower Boomerango is one of the most extreme water attraction in South Korea waterparks. Tubes slide down a 90-degree slope.
The main facilities are: Tower Boomerango, Tower Raft, Wild Blaster, San Juan Restaurant.

See also
 List of water parks

References

External links
Official website 

Everland Resort
1996 establishments in South Korea
Buildings and structures in Yongin
Samsung subsidiaries
Service companies of South Korea
Water parks in South Korea
Buildings and structures in Gyeonggi Province
Tourist attractions in Gyeonggi Province
20th-century architecture in South Korea